Tunay Torun (born 21 April 1990) is a Turkish professional footballer who plays as a winger for Süper Lig club Kasımpaşa.

Club career 
At the age of 16 he moved from FC St. Pauli to the youth side of Hamburger SV. In November 2007, Torun signed a professional contract but was still kept with the youth team for the rest of the season. He made his Bundesliga debut on 23 August 2008, against Karlsruher SC assisting the game-winning goal. He first scored for HSV on 28 November 2009 in an away match against 1. FSV Mainz 05.

Hamburger SV
From 2007 to 2011, Torun played in the youth squads of Hamburger SV and made it into the first team in 2008. He scored his first Bundesliga goal against 1. FSV Mainz 05.

Hertha BSC
During the summer transfer season of 2011, Torun joined Hertha BSC. He scored his first goal for Hertha on 13 August 2011 against his former club Hamburger SV and the game ended in a 2–2 draw.

VfB Stuttgart 
During 2012–13 season, Torun moved VfB Stuttgart on a free transfer and he signed a three-year deal. However, Torun did not get enough playing time playing a total of seven games including the German cup matches. He scored one goal and made one assist in a cup match for VfB Stuttgart.

Kasımpaşa
On 6 January 2014, Torun signed with Kasımpaşa S.K. for three-and-a-half years. Torun scored his first goal on 23 February 2014 against Sivasspor.

İstanbul Başakşehir 
On 1 July 2017, Torun signed a three-year deal with İstanbul Başakşehir.

Bursaspor (loan) 
For the 2018–19 Süper Lig season, he joined Bursaspor with a one year loan deal.

International career 
Torun holds both Turkish and German citizenships. Despite invitations from the German youth team he chose to represent Turkey on international level. He was promoted from the Turkish U17 team to the Under-21s in August 2009. Torun made his debut for the Turkish senior side in a friendly against South Korea on 9 February 2011.

References

External links
 
 
 

1990 births
Living people
Turkish footballers
Association football forwards
Citizens of Turkey through descent
Turkey international footballers
Turkey under-21 international footballers
Turkey youth international footballers
German footballers
German people of Turkish descent
Hamburger SV players
Hamburger SV II players
Hertha BSC players
VfB Stuttgart players
Kasımpaşa S.K. footballers
İstanbul Başakşehir F.K. players
Bursaspor footballers
Fatih Karagümrük S.K. footballers
Bundesliga players
Süper Lig players
Footballers from Hamburg